The Union of Baptist Churches of Cameroon  is a Baptist Christian denomination in Cameroon. It is affiliated with the Baptist World Alliance. The headquarters is in Douala.

History
The Union has its origins in a mission of the Baptist Missionary Society  in 1841 by English and Jamaican missionaries such as Joseph Jackson Fuller and Joseph Merrick.    They are joined by Alfred Saker and his wife in 1845. In 1952, the Union of Baptist Churches of Cameroon was formally founded.  In 2005, it has 15 conventions in Cameroon.  According to a denomination census released in 2020, it claimed 525 churches and 80,000 members.

Schools
It has 19 primary schools, 3 secondary schools. 

It also has 4 professional training institutes. 

It has 2 affiliated theological institutes.

Health Services 
It has 4 hospitals and 16 health centers.

See also
World Evangelical Alliance
Believers' Church
Worship service (evangelicalism)

References

External links
 Official Website

Baptist denominations in Africa
Evangelicalism in Cameroon
Christian denominations in Cameroon